The television series Emergency! originally aired from January 15, 1972, to May 28, 1977. Six seasons, with a total of 122 episodes, aired, followed by six television films during the following two years.

Series overview

Episodes

Pilot movie (1972)

Season 1 (1972)
Two versions of the opening credits sequence were used this season: episodes 1–4 had the original version, while episode 5 onwards had a different version. The latter version was used through the end of Season 4. The music was written, arranged and composed by Nelson Riddle.

Season 2 (1972–73)

Season 3 (1973–74)

Season 4 (1974–75)

Season 5 (1975–76)

Note: Mike Stoker was credited as Firefighter Specialist Stoker starting with Episode 1 of this season
A new set of titles was introduced for this season.

Season 6 (1976–77)
Note: In the final season, Drs. Brackett and Early now have the additional certification of "A.C.E.P." Ms. McCall now exchanges her occasional nurse's dress for a uniform and no longer wears a nurse's cap. Gage and DeSoto now have the designation "Firefighter PM" after their name. Robert Fuller also reduces his on-screen appearances, for the last several episodes of the final season.

The intro now includes the radio transmissions between Rampart and the paramedics and no music. The transmissions, transcribed, read as follows:
Station alarm, followed by sirens, fading into:
 Dispatcher Sam Lanier: "Fifty-One, informant reports toxic chemicals are stored in tanker. Use caution." An explosion follows.
 Brackett: "Squad Fifty-One, this is Rampart; can you send me some EKG?"
 Gage: "10-4; transmitting EKG, we're sending you a strip, vitals to follow. (Pause.) Pulse is one-sixty; the victim is in extreme pain, Rampart." (Beeping, as though to alert a doctor.)
 DeSoto: "Patient is in V-fib! Rampart, we have lost the victim's pulse! Beginning CPR! (A series of beeps.) We're defibrillating victim, Rampart! (Pause.) Rampart, we've defibrillated victim; he's in sinus rhythm."
 Early: "Administer two amps sodium bicarb and insert an airway. (Pause.) Start an IV Fifty-One, lactated Ringer's."
 McCall: "Squad Fifty-One, continue monitoring vitals and transport immediately."
 Gage: "We're on our way, Rampart!"

When the show was put into syndication, the title sequence from Season six was used in all episodes.

Television films (1978–79)

Home releases

References

Emergency!
Emergency